Carl Carpenter Jr. (born October 13, 1935) was an American politician in the state of Florida.

Carpenter was born in Plant City, Florida and attended the University of Florida. He was a pharmacist. He served in the Florida House of Representatives for the 61st district from 1978 to 1999, as a Democrat.

References

Living people
1935 births
Democratic Party members of the Florida House of Representatives
University of Florida alumni
American pharmacists
People from Plant City, Florida